Bratronice is a municipality and village in Kladno District in the Central Bohemian Region of the Czech Republic. It has about 900 inhabitants.

Administrative parts
The village of Dolní Bezděkov is an administrative part of Bratronice.

Notable people
Petr Haničinec (1930–2007), actor; died here

References

Villages in Kladno District